GETS or Gets may refer to:

 Global Environment and Trade Study
 Government Emergency Telecommunications Service
 GE Transportation Systems
 Garrett-Evangelical Theological Seminary
 Members of several Thracian tribes otherwise known collectively as the Getae.
 gets(), a computer programming function that reads a line of input
 Getae or Gets, several Thracian tribes